Cristián Andrés Álvarez Valenzuela (born 20 January 1980) is a Chilean former footballer, who played as a defender.

Club career

Universidad Catolica
As a child, Álvarez and his twin brother, Iván, were with Escuela de Fútbol Municipal de Curicó (Municipal Football Academy of Curicó), later named Juventud 2000, what was founded by his father Luis Hernán. He arrived in 1993 to prove to Universidad Católica next to his twin brother Iván, after the pickers of the UC saw him play in a championship in his native Curicó. He spent three years traveling to Santiago to train and play for the Crusaders, it was not until 1996 that he finally moved to live in Santiago.

For 1997 made his debut in the Professional Squad, he played 31 minutes with just 17 years in the 4–0 win against Colo-Colo (in that duel lined up youths due to a footballers' strike).

Arriving 1999 is officially made with an official jersey on the cross team honor planter. He participated in only 10 official matches until the Chilean national championship of the year 2000, where he played 23 matches with 2 converted goals, together with 21 matches played in 2001.

The year 2002 obtained the titularity in the crossed squad, being champion of the Torneo de Apertura, and playing 43 parties with 2 goals. In that same tournament he put his name at the top of the Crusade history. It was a day on 12 October, while playing the 145th edition of the university classic against University of Chile and after an injury of goalkeeper Jonny Walker. The coach Juvenal Olmos did not have more changes, this was how Cristián Álvarez was who offered to get under the 3 sticks. 71 'minutes had passed. When with jersey and gloves provided, Crístián manages to stop the finishing of the blue scorer Pedro González. The match ended 1-1.

From 2003, until his transfer to the Argentine side River Plate in the middle of 2005, he disputed 78 meetings and scored 19 goals, in spite of being right lateral.

International career
His first match with River Plate was on 7 August 2005 in the 2–0 victory against Tiro Federal. In 2007 moved Alvarez to Beitar Jerusalem. In a match against Maccabi Netanya Alvarez scored a goal from 35 meters which is nominated to be goals of the year. After two years in Israel with Beitar Jerusalem left on 19 August 2009 his club and signed for Chiapas for one season.

back to Universidad Catolica

In 2011, Cristian returned to his home club, Universidad Católica, Where he shared the captaincy of the team with his lifelong friend Milovan Mirosevic.

Cristian Was the captain in 2016, historical year of Universidad Catolica, where they achieved the first bicampeonato in the history of the club, in addition to winning the Super Cup against the archrival Universidad de Chile.

In May 2017, Christian renewed for 6 months more with the club, announcing his retirement in the month of December.

In November 2018, Christian play his last game in San Carlos de Apoquindo, saying goodbye to the public that cheered his name

International career
Álvarez and his twin brother, Iván, represented Chile at under-17 level in both the 1997 South American Championship and the 1997 FIFA World Championship. In addition, represented Chile U20 in the 1999 South American Championship in Argentina.

He competed in the 2000 Summer Olympics in Sydney representing Chile and won the bronze medal. Previously, he took part in the 2000 Pre-Olympic Tournament. 

His debut with the Chilean senior team was in 2000 against Ecuador during qualifications for the 2002 FIFA World Cup. He has 23 caps for his country.

Coaching career
Since 2018 he has worked for Universidad Católica, mainly as a technical consultant, but in 2022 he assumed as coach of youth levels.

Personal life
He is nicknamed Huaso, like the traditional countryman of the Central Chile, due to the fact his birthplace is Curicó, a city in the Maule Region.

His father, Luis Hernán, was the top goalscorer of the 1963 Primera División de Chile playing for Colo-Colo, becoming an idol for the club. His twin brother, Iván, is a former footballer and coincided with Cristián at both Universidad Católica and Chile at under-17 level.

Honours

Club
Universidad Católica
 Primera División de Chile (5): 2002–A, 2005–C, 2016–C, 2016–A, 2018
 Copa Chile (1): 2011
 Supercopa de Chile (1): 2016

Beitar Jerusalem
 Israeli Premier League (2): 2007–08
 Israeli Cup (2): 2008, 2009

International
 Summer Olympic Games: Bronze Medal in Sydney's 2000 Football Championship

References

External links

Biography at River Plate official website

1980 births
Living people
People from Curicó
Chilean twins
Chilean footballers
Club Deportivo Universidad Católica footballers
Club Atlético River Plate footballers
Beitar Jerusalem F.C. players
Chiapas F.C. footballers
Club Universitario de Deportes footballers
Chilean Primera División players
Argentine Primera División players
Israeli Premier League players
Liga MX players
Peruvian Primera División players
Chilean expatriate footballers
Chilean expatriate sportspeople in Argentina
Chilean expatriate sportspeople in Israel
Chilean expatriate sportspeople in Mexico
Chilean expatriate sportspeople in Peru
Expatriate footballers in Argentina
Expatriate footballers in Israel
Expatriate footballers in Mexico
Expatriate footballers in Peru
Chile international footballers
Chile youth international footballers
Chile under-20 international footballers
2004 Copa América players
Footballers at the 2000 Summer Olympics
Olympic footballers of Chile
Olympic bronze medalists for Chile
Olympic medalists in football
Medalists at the 2000 Summer Olympics
Association football defenders
Twin sportspeople
Outfield association footballers who played in goal
Chilean football managers